Jun Falkenstein is an American animation director, writer, and storyboard artist. She directed the film The Tigger Movie in 2000. Falkenstein graduated from the USC School of Cinematic Arts.

Film and television work

 2020: Stillwater - Executive Producer and Supervising Director
 2019: The Lion King - Storyboard artist.
 2017: Monster High: Electrified - Supervising director.
 2016: Monster High: Welcome to Monster High - Supervising director.
 2016: Monster High: Great Scarrier Reef - Supervising director.
 2014: The Jungle Book - Director.
 2007: Kyle + Rosemary & Yaki and Yumi - Creator, writer, storyboard artist, character designer, prop designer, director, voice director and co-executive producer.
 2006: Ballad of the Noob -  Writer, director, editor.
 2006: Curious George - Was the director during pre-production, but pulled from the movie over script differences.
 2005-2006: Johnny Test - Storyboard artist.
 2000: The Tigger Movie - Director and screenplay.
 1999: Mickey's Once Upon a Christmas - Director.
 1999: Winnie the Pooh: Seasons of Giving - Director.
 1998: A Winnie the Pooh Thanksgiving - Director.
 1998: Pocahontas II: Journey to a New World - Storyboard artist.
 1994: Scooby-Doo in Arabian Nights - Director
 1991: Taz-Mania - Animation Posing Artist.

Awards and nominations

Annie Award
 for "Outstanding Individual Achievement for Directing in an Animated Feature Production"
Jun Falkenstein:

References

External links
Waste of Aces

Stone Falcon Productions

1969 births
Artists from Hawaii
American film directors
American film producers
American women screenwriters
USC School of Cinematic Arts alumni
Living people
American voice directors
American women film producers
Walt Disney Animation Studios people